Lockport City High School (also LHS) is a comprehensive New York public high school located on Lincoln Avenue in Lockport, east of the city of Niagara Falls in the Lockport City School District, serving ninth to twelfth grade students. It is the only high school within the district, and is the successor to Aaron Mossell Junior High School. The school is governed under the authority of the New York State Education Department, whose standardized examinations are designed and administered by the Board of Regents of the University of the State of New York. The high school was established in 1954.

Campus
Lockport High School is a 9th through 12th grade institution that includes one building on one campus. The main building, named Lockport High School (LHS), houses grades 9 through 12. Lockport High School has been going through a remodeling state through the years of 2009-2012, it now has a brand-new modern style. The building sits on a corner plot of land on Lincoln Avenue and Locust Street. The campus has also one of each baseball, softball, lacrosse/soccer, and 4 tennis courts.

Administration
The Lockport High School complex is currently administered by a main principal and two assistant principals.
 Mrs. Dawn Wylke, Principal
 Mr. Jason Madden, Assistant Principal
Ms. Heather McClain, Assistant Principal
 Mr. Todd Sukdolak, Director of Athletics, Health, and Wellness

Academics

Curriculum
Lockport High School offers more than 150 different courses in English, Social Studies, Mathematics, Science, Languages Other Than English, Art, Music, Family & Consumer Science, Health, Business, Technology, and Physical Education. Technical career courses are available through Orleans-Niagara Board of Cooperative Education (BOCES). The school focuses on graduating all students with the minimum of a Regents Diploma, but some may also graduate with a less advanced local diploma. The Regents Diploma with Advanced Designation may be achieved with extended studies in a foreign language.

Though the curriculum is developed and sanctioned by the New York State Department of Education, and classes are developed to prepare students to achieve success on the required Regents Examinations, most core courses offer one or two components that explore more advanced topics. The school not only offers standard level Regents courses (Academic level), but also offers more advanced Advanced Placement (AP), College-credit (College), and Honors (H) courses. The criteria used in placing students in the instructional levels are classroom performance, teacher and counselor recommendations, standardized test scores, and individual student preferences. Advanced students may begin earning high school credits in middle school through an accelerated program in mathematics and/ or foreign language.

The school uses a 100 grade point scale, as opposed to the much more common 4.0 scale. The rank in class is established by placing students in descending order from highest to lowest according to their weighted grade point average. The weighted grade point average is calculated with Advanced Placement (AP) courses and College Level courses weighted at 1.1 and Honors Level courses weighted at 1.05.

Course Offerings
 Mathematics: Algebra I, Algebra II, Geometry, Trigonometry, Calculus AB, Precalculus, Statistics
 Science: Biology, Chemistry, Physics, Earth Science, Forensic Science, Environmental Science
 History: Global History, United States History, United States Government & Politics, Economics, Psychology, Sociology
 Foreign Language: Spanish, French, Latin
 Humanities: Writing, Journalism, Public Speaking
 Physical Education and Health: Fitness, Health
 Arts: Studio Art, Choir, Band
 Technology: DECA, Computer-Aided Design, Graphic Design, Broadcasting Technology, Robotics, Introductory Engineering

Advanced Placement
 Science: Biology, Chemistry, 
 Humanities: Language and Composition, Literature and Composition
 Social Studies: World History, United States History, Government & Politics: US, Macroeconomics
 Foreign Language: Spanish, French

Athletics and Extracurriculars

Athletics
Lockport High School's 30 varsity athletic teams the American Division of the CNYCL, Section VI of the New York State Public High School Athletic Association (NYSPHSAA) . Lockport has 30 varsity teams and over 40 other teams that provide a range of team and individual sports. A wide variety of teams claim CNYCL and Section IV championships every year, and the vast majority of athletes are honored with NYS Scholar Athlete Awards. The school has won state titles in multiple individual and team sports including boys and girls cross country, golf, tennis, soccer, swimming, track, wrestling, and football. Many teams also have modified, freshman and junior varsity components. The varsity teams include:

All varsity teams practice and compete on the high school campus, with a few exceptions. The hockey team practices and competes at the Cornerstone CFCU Arena in Lockport, New York. Also, the indoor track teams compete at various colleges and venues.

Stadium
Lockport High School currently competes at Max D. Lederer field at the Emmett Belknap Middle School at 491 High Street in Lockport, New York. Lockport's Football and Track and Field teams compete here. Lockport's Lacrosse and Soccer teams compete on the fields behind Lockport High School. Lockport's track is expected to be re-surfaced during the summer of 2014.

Clubs and Organizations
 Advanced Jazz Ensemble
 African American History Club
 Artscape
 Drama Club
 French Club
 Foreign Exchange Club
 Gay-Straight Alliance
 Interact Club
 Jazz Ensemble
 Math League
 Mindworks Literary
 Recycling Club
 Spanish Club
 Latin Club
 S.A.D.D. Program (Students Against Destructive Decisions)
 Student Council
 The Towpath (Newspaper)
 Warlocks 1507 FRC Robotics
 Wind Ensemble
 Yearbook Club
 Mixed Chorus 
 Concert Choir
 Vocal Jazz Ensamble

National Memberships
LHS has several local chapters of nationwide organizations.
 DECA
 Key Club
 National Spanish Honor Society
 Tri-Music National Honor Society
 Thespian Society
 National Math Honor Society
 National Honor Society
 National Junior Honor Society
 SADD (Students Against Destructive Decisions)

There were 96 teachers employed at the school, making the student to teacher ratio approximately 18:1.

Notable alumni
Kim Alexis - Model and actress
David Fluellen - NFL running back who currently plays for the Titans
William G. Gregory - American retired NASA astronaut and United States Air Force lieutenant colonel
 Warren Hull - Actor, radio and television personality
William E. Miller - U.S. Congressman
Chris Sacca - Billionaire investor in Twitter, Uber, Instagram, Kickstarter and a guest shark on Shark Tank
Daren Stone - NFL linebacker

External links
Lockport High School website
Lockport High School Milesplit homepage,

References

Public high schools in New York (state)
Schools in Niagara County, New York
1954 establishments in New York (state)